Houdini is a 1998 American biographical drama television film about the life of the magician Harry Houdini, written and directed by Pen Densham. It stars Johnathon Schaech, Stacy Edwards, Paul Sorvino and David Warner. It debuted on TNT on December 6, 1998.

Plot
The film details the life, relationships and exploits of the famous magician.

Cast
 Johnathon Schaech as Harry Houdini
 Emile Hirsch as Young Harry Houdini 
 Stacy Edwards as Bess Houdini
 Paul Sorvino as Blackburn
 Rhea Perlman as Esther
 David Warner as Sir Arthur Conan Doyle
 Mark Ruffalo as Theo
 Grace Zabriskie as Mrs. Weiss
 Ron Perlman as Booking Agent
 Karl Makinen as Jim Collins
 Judy Geeson as Lady Doyle
 George Segal as Beck

Home release
The DVD is available as part of the burn-on-demand Warner Archive service.

References

External links
Houdini at IMDb
Houdini at TCM
Houdini at Warner Archive

1998 television films
1998 films
1998 drama films
1990s American films
1990s biographical drama films
American biographical drama films
American drama television films
Biographical films about entertainers
Biographical television films
Cultural depictions of Arthur Conan Doyle
Cultural depictions of Harry Houdini
Films about magic and magicians
Films directed by Pen Densham
TNT Network original films